A handmaid, or handmaiden, is a historic type of personal servant

Handmaid, The Handmaid or The Handmaiden may also refer to:

Biology
 Handmaid or Dysauxes ancilla, a moth in the family Erebidae

 Handmaiden moth, or Syntomoides imaon, a moth in the family Erebidae

Media
 Handmaid Media, Australian film production company headed by Samantha Lang
 The Handmaiden, (아가씨; Agassi) a 2016 Korean film based on Sarah Waters' Fingersmith

See also 
 Hand (disambiguation)
 Handmaids of Charity, an Italian religious institution
 The Handmaid's Tale (1985), a novel by Margaret Atwood 
 The Handmaid's Tale (film)
 The Handmaid's Tale (opera)
 The Handmaid's Tale (TV series)

 Maid (disambiguation)
 Maiden (disambiguation)